Matameye  is a department of the Zinder Region in Niger. Its capital lies at the city of Matameye. The chief town lies 72 km from Magaria.   It also includes the town of Kantché. As of 2011, the department had a total population of 345,637 people.

References

Departments of Niger
Zinder Region